McMillan Firearms is an American arms manufacturer best known for the McMillan Tac-50, its .50 BMG long-range anti-materiel and sniper rifle. It also produces the McMillan Tac-338, McMillan Tac-300 and McMillan Tac-308 sniper rifles, the ALIAS Rifle System and various hunting rifles.

History
In 2007 Ryan McMillan co-founded McMillan Firearms Manufacturing before it was sold in late 2013 to Strategic Armory Corps, adding to its hunting and tactical division. 

McMillan Firearms is based in Phoenix, Arizona and it also has a distribution office in Johannesburg, South Africa.

References

External links
 

Firearm manufacturers of the United States
Manufacturing companies based in Phoenix, Arizona